Leon Kelly was an artist.

Leon Kelly may also refer to:

Leon Kelly (footballer)
Leon Kelly, N-Trance